The grey-breasted babbler (Malacopteron albogulare) is a species of bird in the family Pellorneidae.
It is found in Brunei, Indonesia and Malaysia.
Its natural habitats are subtropical or tropical moist lowland forest and subtropical or tropical swampland.
It is threatened by habitat loss.

References

Collar, N. J. & Robson, C. 2007. Family Timaliidae (Babblers)  pp. 70 – 291 in; del Hoyo, J., Elliott, A. & Christie, D.A. eds. Handbook of the Birds of the World, Vol. 12. Picathartes to Tits and Chickadees. Lynx Edicions, Barcelona.

grey-breasted babbler
Birds of Malesia
grey-breasted babbler
grey-breasted babbler
Taxonomy articles created by Polbot